Thomas McGunnigle (born 31 March 1905) was a Scottish footballer who played for Celtic, Glentoran, Dumbarton, Cork and Brechin City.

References

1905 births
Scottish footballers
Dumbarton F.C. players
Celtic F.C. players
Brechin City F.C. players
Scottish Football League players
Year of death missing
Footballers from Glasgow
Glentoran F.C. players
Association football outside forwards
Maryhill Hibernians F.C. players
Scottish Junior Football Association players
Scottish expatriate footballers
Cork F.C. players
Expatriate association footballers in the Republic of Ireland
Scottish expatriate sportspeople in Ireland